Colotrachelus is a genus of small sea snails, marine gastropod mollusks in the family Caymanabyssiidae, the false limpets.

Species
Species within the genus Colotrachelus include:
 Colotrachelus hestica B.A. Marshall, 1986

References

External links
 To ITIS
 To World Register of Marine Species

Caymanabyssiidae
Monotypic gastropod genera